The historic Brainerd Public Library is a Carnegie library built in 1904. The building is located at 206 7th Street North in Brainerd, Minnesota, United States, and is in the Classical Revival architectural style using granite and brick. The façade of the building features a portico with four columns holding up a pedimented gable. Although the building was originally a library, it later was used briefly as an antiques store, and is currently a law office.

The Brainerd Public Library is now located at 416 S 5th Street in a building constructed in 1986.

References

Carnegie libraries in Minnesota
Buildings and structures in Crow Wing County, Minnesota
Libraries on the National Register of Historic Places in Minnesota
Library buildings completed in 1904
National Register of Historic Places in Crow Wing County, Minnesota
Public libraries in Minnesota
Former library buildings in the United States